The Battle of Dangpo was a naval engagement during the Japanese invasions of Korea (1592–1598) on 10 July that resulted in Yi Sun-sin's victory.

Prelude
The day after the Battle of Sacheon, Admiral Yi Sun-shin had his fleet rest in the open sea off Saryang where they would have the tactical advantage were the Japanese to execute a counterattack. Admiral Yi once again summoned his resting fleet to arms the morning of July 10 (lunar June 2) when he received a report that 21 Japanese ships were docked at the harbor of Dangpo.

At Dangpo, the subordinate of Kurushima Michifusa, Kurushima Michiyuki, was commanding his troops to loot and burn a coastal town.

The Attack
As the Korean fleet approached the Dangpo harbor, Yi Sun-shin noticed that the flagship of this Japanese fleet was anchored among the other vessels. Realizing the golden opportunity, Admiral Yi led the assault with his own flagship (a turtleship) targeting the Japanese flagship. The sturdy construction of his turteship allowed Yi Sun-shin to easily ram through the line of Japanese ships and position his ship right alongside the anchored Japanese flagship. The light construction of the Japanese ship was no match for a full broadside assault and was left sinking in minutes. From the turtle ship, a hail of cannonballs rained down on the other ships, destroying more vessels. The Koreans circled the other ships anchored and began to sink them. Then, Korean general Kwon Joon shot an arrow into Michiyuki. The Japanese commander fell dead and a Korean captain jumped onboard and cut off his head.

The Japanese soldiers panicked upon seeing the beheading of their admiral and were slaughtered by the Koreans in their confusion. The remaining Japanese abandoned the fight and fled into the hills.Admiral Yi ordered a landing party to destroy the enemy base on the beach, but once again was forced to recall his order when he heard reports that at least 20 ships were bearing down on them from Koje-do. Wishing to give his fleet the greatest tactical advantage possible, he ordered his ships to sail out of the bay and into the open sea. The battle would not continue on this day, however, as the Japanese ships made a hasty retreat into the descending darkness upon seeing the intimidating Korean fleet.

Aftermath
After the battle, the Koreans searched Kurushima's flagship and captured a beautiful golden fan that belonged to Kamei Korenori. 

Yi Sun-sin and Won Gyun spent the next two days searching for more enemy ships. On 11 July Yi Eokgi joined them with 25 more warships, bringing their fleet strength to 51 ships in total. Admiral Yi then set out and searched the surrounding islands until he received a report from fishermen that another small fleet of Japanese ships lay anchored at Danghangpo, which was to be the site of another battle.

References

Bibliography

 
 
 
 
 
 
 
 
 
 
 
 桑田忠親 [Kuwata, Tadachika], ed., 舊參謀本部編纂, [Kyu Sanbo Honbu], 朝鮮の役 [Chousen no Eki]　(日本の戰史 [Nihon no Senshi] Vol. 5), 1965.
 
 
 
 
 
 
 
 
 
 
 
 
  
 
 
 
 
 
 

Dangpo Battle
1592 in Asia
1592 in Japan
Conflicts in 1592
Yi Sun-sin